The launch of Space Shuttle missions was governed by a countdown. Two clocks were maintained, the unofficial, but sometimes mentioned, L (launch) clock represented the time remaining before the scheduled launch in real time, and the more often referred to T (test) clock included several built-in holds where additional verifications were made. Built-in holds were extended if mission parameters allowed for additional checks or to correct issues.

Milestones
 Call to stations, ~72 hours before launch time

T−43 hours and counting
 Begin final vehicle and facility close-outs for launch
 Check out backup flight systems
 Review flight software stored in mass memory units and display systems
 Load backup flight system software into the orbiter's general purpose computers
 Remove middeck and flight deck platforms
 Activate and test navigational systems
 Complete preparation to load power reactant storage and distribution system
 Complete flight deck preliminary inspections

T−27 hours and holding
 This was the first built-in hold and typically lasted four hours.
 Clear launch pad of all non-essential personnel
 Begin loading cryogenic propellants into orbiter's power reactant storage and distribution (PRSD) system

T−27 hours and counting
 Begin loading of cryogenic reactants into the orbiter's fuel cell storage tanks

T−19 hours and holding
This built-in hold typically lasted four hours, but was extended if PRSD offload is required. During this hold:
 Demate the orbiter's midbody umbilical unit
 Clean and vacuum crew module
 External tank nosecone purge

T−19 hours and counting
 Begin final preparations of the orbiter's three main engines for main propellant tanking and flight
 Fill launch pad sound suppression system water tank
 Resume orbiter and ground support equipment close-outs
 Close out the tail service masts on the mobile launcher platform

T−11 hours and holding
This built-in hold varied between 13 and 14 hours.
 Weather and engineering briefings
 Pad debris inspection and closeout
 Flight crew equipment late stow
 Move rotating service structure to "park" position
 Activate the orbiter's inertial measurement units and communications systems
 Perform ascent switch list

T−11 hours and counting
 Activate the orbiter's fuel cells
 Clear the blast danger area of all nonessential personnel
 Switch the orbiter's purge air to gaseous nitrogen

T−6 hours and holding
This built-in hold typically lasted two hours, or one hour for a 24- or 48-hour scrub. Countdown may be resumed at this point after a 24‑hour scrub/turnaround.
 Mission Management Team and launch director receive weather update
 Launch team verifies no violations of launch commit criteria before loading the external tank with propellants
 Chill-down of propellant transfer lines

T−6 hours and counting
 The external tank was inspected for frost and debris
 The external tank was checked for concentration of H2 around the orbiter
 Finish filling the external tank with its flight load of liquid hydrogen and liquid oxygen propellants

T−3 hours and holding
This built-in hold typically lasted two-and-a-half hours.
 External tank loading enters stable replenish
 Perform inertial measurement unit preflight calibration
 Align Merritt Island Launch Area (MILA) tracking antennas
 Final Inspection Team proceeds to the launch pad to conduct a detailed analysis of the vehicle as the team walks up and down the entire launch tower
 Closeout Crew proceeds to the launch pad to configure the crew module for countdown and launch and assist the astronauts with entry into the orbiter
 Televised weather briefing
 Flight crew weather briefing
 Astronaut Support Person enters crew module and begins comm checks

T−3 hours and counting
 Crew departs for the launch pad and, upon arriving at the pad, begins entry into the orbiter via the White Room
 Complete close-out preparations in the launch pad's White Room
 Check cockpit switch configurations
 Astronauts perform air-to-ground voice checks with Launch Control (Kennedy Space Center) and Mission Control (Johnson Space Center)
 Close the orbiter's crew hatch and check for leaks
 Complete White Room close-out
 Close-out crew retreats to fallback area

T−20 minutes and holding
This built-in hold typically lasted 10 minutes.
 NASA Test Director conducts final launch team briefings
 Complete inertial measurement unit preflight alignments

T−20 minutes and counting
 Once the countdown resumed, the orbiter's onboard computers transition to launch configuration
 Start fuel cell thermal conditioning
 Close orbiter cabin vent valves
 Transition backup flight system to launch configuration

T−9 minutes and holding
This was the final built-in hold, and varied in length depending on the mission.
 During the hold, final launch window determination
 Activate flight recorders
 Final "go/no-go" launch polls conducted by NASA Test Director, Mission Management Team and Launch Director

T−9 minutes and counting
 Once the countdown resumed, start automatic ground launch sequencer
 Retract orbiter access arm (T−7 minutes, 30 seconds)

T−5 minutes and counting
 Start auxiliary power units (APUs)
 Arm solid rocket booster range safety safe and arm devices
 Start orbiter aerosurface profile test, followed by main engine gimbal profile test (T−3 minutes, 55 seconds)
 Retract gaseous oxygen vent arm, or "beanie cap" (T−2 minutes, 50 seconds)
 Crew members close and lock their visors (T−2 minutes, 0 seconds)
 Orbiter transfers from ground to internal power (T−50 seconds)
 Ground launch sequencer is go for auto sequence start (T−31 seconds)
 Activate launch pad sound suppression system (T−16 seconds)

T−10 seconds and counting
 Activate main engine hydrogen burnoff system (T−10 seconds)
 Ground launch sequencer commands main engine start (T−6.6 seconds)

T−0 seconds
 Solid Rocket Boosters ignite
 Explosive bolts release the boosters
 Shuttle stack lifts off from launch pad

References

NASA